Samuele Buttarelli (born 2 May 1992 in Genoa) is a professional racing driver from Italy.

Career

Master Junior Formula
Buttarelli began his single–seater career in the Spanish–based Master Junior Formula in 2007. He competed in just three of the 21 races and was subsequently classified in 23rd place.

Formula Renault 2.0
The following year, Buttarelli stepped up to Formula Renault, competing in the Italian Formula Renault 2.0 and Swiss Formula Renault 2.0 series with Cram Competition.

In the Italian series, he competed in the first ten races of the season before leaving the championship, taking a best result of 10th at Misano, whilst in the Swiss series he took part in six races, with a sixth place at Hockenheim being his best race result.

Formula Three
In 2009, Buttarelli graduated to Formula Three, racing in the newly named European F3 Open Championship for the emiliodevillota.com team. He took part in the first six rounds of the season before leaving the series after the Monza round in October, where he had just secured his best race results of the season. He was classified in 18th place in the standings. In June 2009, Buttarelli joined Carlin Motorsport to contest the Masters of Formula 3 event held at Zandvoort. After qualifying on the back row of the grid, he finished as the last classified finisher in 31st position. In September 2009, he also made his debut in the Italian Formula Three Championship, racing for RC Motorsport at Imola, where he finished the two races in 18th and 17th places respectively.

For the 2010 season, Buttarelli joined Prema Powerteam to contest the Italian Formula Three Championship. After securing three podium places and a fastest lap in the first ten races, Buttarelli split with the team after the fifth round at Varano. He did, however, secure a seat alongside Daniel Mancinelli at Team Ghinzani in time for the next round of the series at Vallelunga, where he took a podium in the second race. He eventually finished the season in eighth place.

Formula Le Mans
In July 2009, Buttarelli took part in a one–off round of the Formula Le Mans series in Portimão, sharing an Oreca FLM09 with GP2 Series regular Jérôme d'Ambrosio, who was using the weekend to learn the circuit as it would host the final round of the GP2 Series season. The pair dominated the event, winning both races whilst also taking a pole position and fastest lap. However, as they were guest drivers they were ineligible for championship points.

International Formula Master
In his four races in the series he took a best result of ninth in the Hungaroring sprint race.

Racing record

Career summary

† – As Buttarelli was a guest driver, he was ineligible for championship points.

References

External links
  
 

1992 births
Living people
Sportspeople from Genoa
Italian racing drivers
Italian Formula Three Championship drivers
Euroformula Open Championship drivers
International Formula Master drivers
Italian Formula Renault 2.0 drivers
Formula Renault 2.0 Alps drivers
Auto GP drivers
FIA Formula Two Championship drivers
Prema Powerteam drivers
De Villota Motorsport drivers
Cram Competition drivers
RC Motorsport drivers
DAMS drivers
Carlin racing drivers